The 18th Annual D.I.C.E. Awards is the 18th edition of the D.I.C.E. Awards, an annual awards event that honors the best games in the video game industry. It was also held as part of the Academy's 2015 D.I.C.E. Summit, and was hosted by stand up comedian Pete Holmes.

Middle-earth: Shadow of Mordor was the only video game who have swept the most awards except Game of the Year, in which Dragon Age: Inquisition won. Ubisoft received the most nominations as a publisher with Ubisoft Montreal receiving the most nominations as a developer.

Allan Alcorn received the Pioneer Award, for creating Pong, one of the first video games. Ralph H. Baer, designer of the Magnavox Odyssey, also was posthumously awarded the Pioneer Award. The Apple App Store received the first Technical Impact Award.

Winners and Nominees
Winners are listed first, highlighted in boldface, and indicated with a double dagger.

Special Awards

Pioneer
 Allan Alcorn
 Ralph H. Baer

Technical Impact
 Apple App Store

Games with multiple nominations and awards

The following 20 games received multiple nominations:

The following four games received multiple awards:

Companies with multiple nominations

Companies that received multiple nominations as either a developer or a publisher.

Companies that received multiple awards as either a developer or a publisher.

External links

References

2015 awards
2015 awards in the United States
February 2015 events in the United States
2014 in video gaming
D.I.C.E. Award ceremonies